Events in the year 2020 in Tonga.

Incumbents 

 Monarch: Tupou VI
 Prime Minister: Pōhiva Tuʻiʻonetoa

Events 
Ongoing – COVID-19 pandemic in Oceania

May 

 22 May – Even though no cases have been reported in the country, various travel and quarantining restrictions were put in place. Cruise ships and yachts were also banned from docking in the country.

March 

 27 March – Prime Minister Pohiva Tu'i'onetoa announced that the country would be under a lock-down from 29 March until 5 April.

References 

 
Years of the 21st century in Tonga
Tonga
Tonga
2020s in Tonga